Crum is an unincorporated community in  Lewis County, Kentucky, United States.

The origins of the name Crum is unclear.  A post office was established in 1882, and closed in 1924.

References

Unincorporated communities in Lewis County, Kentucky
Unincorporated communities in Kentucky